The 1919 Michigan Agricultural Aggies football team represented Michigan Agricultural College (MAC) as an independent during the 1919 college football season. In their tenth non-consecutive year under head coach Chester Brewer (Brewer previously coached the Aggies from 1903 to 1910 and in 1917), the Aggies compiled a 4–4–1 record and outscored their opponents 132 to 99.

Schedule

References

Michigan Agricultural
Michigan State Spartans football seasons
Michigan Agricultural Aggies football